Black mussel is a common name for several mussels and may refer to:

Choromytilus meridionalis, native to southern Africa
Mytilus galloprovincialis
Mytilus trossulus, native to the north Pacific, Arctic, and north Atlantic oceans